Lombard Street may refer to:

Roads
 Lombard Street, London, England
 Rue des Lombards, Paris, France
 Lombard Street, Petworth, shopping street in Petworth

United States
 Lombard Street (San Francisco), California, steep with hairpin turns
 Lombard Street (Baltimore), Maryland
 Lombard Street (Philadelphia), Pennsylvania
 See also Lombard Street riot
 Lombard Street, Portland, Oregon, part of US 30 Bypass

Other uses
 Lombard Street: A Description of the Money Market, a book by Walter Bagehot